Hippobosca equina, also known as the forest fly or New Forest fly, is a biting fly from the family Hippoboscidae. They are blood-feeding ectoparasites of primarily horses and other large mammals including cattle. It is a permanently fully winged fly, not shedding its wings on finding its host, as in some other Hippoboscidae. With its wings retained, it may thus fly away from its host to deposit its larvae. They are good fliers.

Description

Wing length .
Generally pale reddish brown with yellow spots on the indistinctly segmented abdomen.
They have one pair of sub-triangular wings and the wing veins are crowded together towards the anterior border.
The characteristic feature of these flies is that they move sidewards and they feed preferably between the hind legs and on the perineum region.

Distribution
The primary distribution is in Europe and parts of Asia and Africa. It has been introduced to other locations, though in some cases latter eradicated by modern husbandry practices. In the United Kingdom they are known primarily from the New Forest and increasingly from South Devon. There are occasionally recorded from other part of the UK, though some reports as far north as the Scottish borders are considered dubious. In the United Kingdom, their flight period is from May to October, but peaking August and early September.

Hosts 
Their primary host are equines; they are often also frequently found on cattle on which they are able to maintain a population. They have been known to bite a number of other mammals, including sheep and goats. Though it is actively attracted to humans and will land, it does not often bite them. Other mammals it may also live on are red deer, camel and rabbit. Also on birds: the grey heron, and the northern goshawk. They have been fed and bred on  guinea pigs in the laboratory.

References 

Parasitic flies
Parasites of equines
Ectoparasites
Hippoboscidae
Flies described in 1758
Muscomorph flies of Europe
Taxa named by Carl Linnaeus